Dick Stanley Richards (10 September 1908 – 13 November 1995) was an English cricketer. He was a right-handed batsman who bowled slow left-arm orthodox. He was born at Bognor, Sussex.

Richards made his first-class debut for Sussex against Worcestershire in the 1927 County Championship at the County Ground, Hove. He made seventeen further first-class appearances for the county, the last of which came against Surrey in the 1935 County Championship at The Saffrons, Eastbourne. In his eighteen first-class appearances for the county, he scored 220 runs at an average of 10.00, with a high score of 23. With the ball, he bowled a total of 63 overs, but took just a single wicket, that of Surrey's Stan Squires, in what was Richards' final first-class appearance.

Richards stood as an umpire in four first-class matches from 1932 to 1934. He also stood in 55 Minor Counties Championship matches from 1953 to 1964.

He died at Worthing, Sussex, on 13 November 1995. His brother-in-law, Jim Parks, played Test cricket for England, while Henry Parks, also his brother-in-law, played first-class cricket, as did his great-nephew, Bobby Parks. His nephew, Jim Parks, Jr., also played Test cricket for England.

References

External links
Dick Richards at ESPNcricinfo
Dick Richards at CricketArchive

1908 births
1995 deaths
People from Bognor Regis
English cricketers
Sussex cricketers
English cricket umpires